Bhooter Bhabishyat (ভূতের ভবিষ্যৎ ) is a 2012 Indian Bengali ghost comedy film directed by Anik Dutta. The film became one of the biggest hits of 2012 among the Bengali films. It is a film with supernatural element. It is the directorial debut of Anik Dutta. It was well received by various critics for its direction, and storyline.

Plot
Ayan Sengupta, an ad director, visits a palace-like house for shooting his new ad. His dream is to make a movie but he doesn't have enough money. A man named Biplab Dasgupta, whom Ayan encounters in the house, narrates a story to him. The story is about an old decrepit house called the Chowdury Mansion, which was haunted by the spirit of its last owner, before other wandering ghosts settled down.  

A shooting of a movie named 'Antarjash' was happening where Madhumita Sanyal, the lead actress, lost consciousness while she gave shot. When she regained consciousness, she said that she saw the reflection of a unknown woman in the mirror.  

The first section of the story, describes the ghosts familiarizing with each other and as their initial hostility towards each other disappears,  they start to regard each other as friends. Unfortunately, this atmosphere of peace and tranquility is destroyed when the ghosts discover that a greedy, plot dealer had made up his mind to convert the large, old house into a deluxe shopping mall. It is then upon the ghosts to figure out, how they will go about trying to save the house that granted them shelter, even after their deaths. Will they be able to save Chowdury Mansion from the prying eyes of the selfish dealer? Will Ayan be able to identify who this Biplab Dasgupta is and make his film debut?

Cast (in order of appearance)
 Paran Bandopadhyay as Darpa Narayan Chowdhury, the ghost of a 19th century zamindar, and the last owner of the mansion
 Swastika Mukherjee as Kadalibala Dasi, an actress's ghost from the 1940s
 Sumit Samaddar as Bhootnath Bhaduri, the ghost of a refugee from Bangladesh
 Sabyasachi Chakrabarty as Biplab Dasgupta, the story teller and the ghost of a Naxalite
 George Baker as Sir Donald Ramsey, an Englishman's ghost who was killed by a freedom fighter
 Mir Afsar Ali as Ganesh Bhutoria, the builder
 Udayshankar Pal as Atmaram Paswan, a rickshawpuller ghost from Bihar
 Pradip DasGupta as Khaja Khan, the ghost of the cook who served Siraj-ud-Daula
 Samadarshi Dutta as Pablo Patranabis, the rock musician ghost
 Mumtaz Sorcar as Koel Dhar, the ghost of an industrialist's daughter
 Parambrata Chatterjee as Ayan Sengupta, an aspiring director
 Biswajit Chakraborty as Brigadier Yudhajit Sarkar, an army officer's ghost who died during the Kargil War
 Arunava Dutta as Nantu, Production Manager
 Ashes Bhattacharyya as lawyer of Ganesh Bhutoria
 Bibhu Bhattacharya as Sudhirbabu, caretaker of "Chowdhury Palace"
 Saswata Chatterjee as Haatkata Kartik, a criminal ghost
 Sreelekha Mitra as Madhumita Sanyal
 Monami Ghosh as Laxmi, Bhutoria's dead wife
 Kharaj Mukherjee as Pramod Pradhan aka Pod Podhan (Po'od P'odhan)
 Sanjay Biswas as T. K. Guchait, Bhutoria's secretary
 Anindita Bose as Rinka
 Debdut Ghosh as Keshab Narayan Chowdhury, lover of Kadalibala
Suchismita Chowdhury as Sonali, the news reporter who was shown before the casting of the movie
 Md Jakir Hossain as Raj

Release
Bengali film stars were present in the screening of the film in March 2012. The Indian Express gave Bhooter Bhabishyat a four-star rating and described the film as "one of the most intelligent and satiric comedies one has seen in a long time". The film was also released in Mumbai, Bangalore and Delhi in April 2012.

Remake
The film has been remade in Hindi as Gang of Ghosts, directed by Satish Kaushik.

Legacy 
Two of the films character has been portrayed in an ad-film of Bisk Farm Top biscuit; where Debdut Ghosh reprises his role as Keshab Narayan Chowdhury, and actor Pushpita Mukherjee replaces Swastika Mukherjee as Kadalibala Dasi.

See also 
 Ashchorjyo Prodeep
 Chhayamoy
 Jekhane Bhooter Bhoy

References

External links
 
 

2012 films
2012 comedy horror films
Indian comedy horror films
Films scored by Raja Narayan Deb
Films set in country houses
Bengali films remade in other languages
Bengali-language Indian films
2010s Bengali-language films
Films directed by Anik Dutta